Fire Creek is a ghost town in Fayette County, West Virginia, United States.  It was located on the New River Gorge.

Notable people
 Claud Ashton Jones - former Rear Admiral and Medal of Honor recipient.

References 

Unincorporated communities in West Virginia
Unincorporated communities in Fayette County, West Virginia
Coal towns in West Virginia
Ghost towns in West Virginia